A district health authority was an administrative territorial entity of the National Health Service in England and Wales introduced by the National Health Service Reorganisation Act 1973.

District health authorities existed in Britain from 1974 to 1996. Until 1982 there was a tier above them – the area health authority.  There were 205 when they were established in 1974, but some were later amalgamated. In 1979 there were 199.

The districts were a third-tier below the regional health authority and the area health authority (which generally corresponded to non-metropolitan counties, metropolitan boroughs or groups of London boroughs) and the district management teams that ran the hospitals on a day-to-day basis. The most common complaint in evidence about the reorganisation of the NHS made to the Royal Commission on the National Health Service in 1979 was that it added an extra and unnecessary tier of management.

Each district health authority worked alongside a family health services authority, which was responsible for managing primary care services such as general practice, pharmacy and dentistry.

The districts were reorganised on a number of occasions in the 1990s. In 1996 new single-tier health authorities replaced districts and areas and the regions were again reorganised. In 2002 health authorities were replaced by primary care trusts.

See also
 List of district health authorities in England and Wales

References

Defunct National Health Service organisations